Here I Stand may refer to:

 "Hier stehe ich" ("Here I stand"), a statement attributed to Martin Luther at the Diet of Worms (1521)
 Here I Stand: A Life of Martin Luther, a 1950 book by Roland Bainton
 Here I Stand (book), a 1958 manifesto-autobiography by Paul Robeson
 Paul Robeson: Here I Stand, a 1999 DVD about Paul Robeson
 (Here I Stand) In the Spirit of Paul Robeson, a public artwork in Washington, D.C.
 Here I Stand (boardgame), a 2006 card-based wargame published by GMT Games

Music
 Here I Stand (Oysterband album), 1999
 Here I Stand (Usher album), 2008
 "Here I Stand" (Usher song), 2008
 "Here I Stand" (Vasil Garvanliev song), representing North Macedonia at Eurovision 2021
 "Here I Stand", a song by Madina Lake from From Them, Through Us, to You, 2007
 "Here I Stand", a song by Milltown Brothers, 1991